Nova Scotia: New Scottish Speculative Fiction is an anthology showcasing Scottish science fiction and fantasy, compiled by Neil Williamson and Andrew J. Wilson.  The book was among the finalists for the 2006 World Fantasy Award for Best Anthology.

Stories
 The Cost of Pearls by Edwin Morgan
 A Case of Consilience by Ken MacLeod
 Deus ex Homine by Hannu Rajaniemi
 Not Wisely But Too Well by A.J. McIntosh
 Third-Degree Burns by Andrew J. Wilson
 Lest We Forget by Marion Arnott
 The Intrigue of the Battered Box by Michael Cobley
 Five Fantastic Fictions by Ron Butlin
 Running on at Adventures by Angus McAllister
 A Knot of Toads by Jane Yolen
 Sophie and the Sacred Fluid by Andrew C. Ferguson
 Vanilla for the Lady by Deborah J. Miller
 Pisces Ya Bas by Gavin Inglis
 The Vulture, 4 - 17 March by Harvey Welles and Philip Raines
 The Bogle's Bargain by Stefan Pearson
 Criggie by Matthew Fitt
 Snowball's Chance by Charles Stross
 Total Mental Quality, by the Way by William Meikle
 The Bennie and the Bonobo by Neil Williamson
 The Hard Stuff by John Grant
 Dusk by Jack Deighton

References

External links
Review at Infinity Plus
Review at Tangent Online

Science fiction anthologies
Fantasy anthologies
Scottish science fiction